Mondinense Futebol Clube is a Portuguese sports club from Mondim de Basto.

The men's football team played on the third-tier Campeonato de Portugal in 2015–16, 2017–18 and 2020–21, but were relegated on every occasion.

In the Taça de Portugal, Mondinense notably reached the fourth round of the 2010–11 edition.

References

Football clubs in Portugal
Association football clubs established in 1924
1924 establishments in Portugal